Chrysops sepulcralis  is a species of 'horse flies' belonging to the family Tabanidae.

It is a Palearctic species with a limited distribution in Europe

Description
The abdomen is black, dorsally and ventrally, and without a conspicuous yellow pattern.
The frons and face are almost entirely bare, shining brown.

Biology
Chrysops sepulcralis is found near ponds and boggy areas on heaths and moors.

References

Tabanidae
Insects described in 1794
Taxa named by Johan Christian Fabricius
Diptera of Europe